Reginald Jackson  (5 April 1913 – 5 August 1989) was an Australian police officer and Chief Commissioner of Victoria Police from 1971 to 1977.

Police career

Early career 
Jackson joined Victoria Police in 1934 and served for 44 years, including postings at Mildura, Malvern and South Melbourne as well as the Breaking Squad and the Stolen Motor Vehicle Squad. He was appointed Inspector in 1961 and made responsible for police public relations. In 1963 he was appointed Assistant Commissioner and in 1969 Deputy Commissioner. Jackson was also a part president and life member of the Police Association Victoria—the police union—Chairman of the Youth Advisory Panel and a member of the Police Superannuation Board.

Promotion to Chief Commissioner 
On the retirement on the grounds of ill-health of Noel Wilby in 1971, Jackson was appointed Chief Commissioner at the age of 58. Jackson held the post until 1977 when he was replaced by Mick Miller. While Chief Commissioner, Jackson maintained his membership of the Police Association Victoria. He was responsible for the acquisition of the Victoria Police Academy at Glen Waverley.

Jackson was Chief Commissioner during the Beach Inquiry, established by the Victorian government to investigate corrupt behaviour by police officers relating to illegal abortion activity. The inquiry was unpopular with serving police officers and over 4,000 police officers met at Festival Hall to discuss possible strike action. Jackson addressed the meeting and urged officers to show restraint. At the end of his address, the officers unanimously passed a vote of confidence in Jackson as Chief Commissioner. The meeting put forward a series of demands that were accepted by the government and strike action was averted.

Jackson was described as a "Policeman's policeman" and "one of the most popular Chief Commissioners in the history of the Victoria Police force". He died in 1989 aged 75. Jackson was married with three daughters.

Controversy 
At the Royal Commission into Institutional Responses to Child Sexual Abuse in 2015, Jackson's successor Mick Miller testified that he believed that Jackson, while Chief Commissioner, was part of a criminal conspiracy to obstruct an investigation into child sex offences allegedly committed in 1971 in Mildura by Monsignor John Day.

Honours and awards

References

1913 births
1989 deaths
Police officers from Melbourne
Chief Commissioners of Victoria Police
Australian recipients of the Queen's Police Medal
Australian Lieutenants of the Royal Victorian Order
Australian Companions of the Order of St Michael and St George
Officers of the Order of St John
Australian justices of the peace